Popping boba, also called Popping Pearls, is a type of "boba" used in bubble tea. Unlike traditional boba, which is tapioca-based, popping boba is made using the spherification process that relies on the reaction of sodium alginate and either calcium chloride or calcium lactate. Popping boba has a thin, gel-like skin with juice inside that bursts when squeezed. The ingredients for popping boba generally consist of water, sugar, fruit juice or other flavors, and the ingredients required for spherification.

In addition to being used in place of traditional boba in bubble tea, it is used in smoothies, slushies and as a topping for frozen yogurt.

Some popular flavors of popping boba include mango, passion fruit, strawberry, green tea, honeydew melon, pomegranate, blueberry and kiwi.

References 

Taiwanese drinks